Melisses (Greek; Μέλισσες, stylized as "ΜΕΛΙSSES") are Christos Mastoras (vocals), Costas Mavrogennis (bass) and Thanos Laitsas (guitar). They are one of the most successful bands in Greek discography and since 2014 they belong to the roster of Panik Records.

Their career started in 2008 and since then they have been one of the most successful bands in Greece, making and breaking records. Indicatively, they have 1 gold record and 12 triple platinum, platinum and gold digital singles, 10 of their songs have entered the top 10 of the radio chart and 5 of their singles have remained in no1 of airplay for more than 70 weeks. At the same time, they count more than 450 million YouTube views and 60 million Spotify streams, they have made over 1,300 live shows and they have appeared in the most important theaters throughout Greece. Also they have won 21 Mad VMA music awards, of which 9 times this for Best Band and they have collaborated with more than 30 artists from all music genres.

History
The band was created in May 2008, with Christos Mastoras on vocals, Thanos Laitsas on guitar, Kostas Mavrogenis on bass, Pantelis Kyramargios on keyboards and Iakovos Sampsakis on drums. The current composition of the group emerged after the withdrawals of Iakovos Sampsakis (2015) and Pantelis Kyramargios (2017).

The name MELISSES came from a random event, which turned out to be karmic. "We were all members of the group in Thiseio and we drank rakomela. At some point, a guy passes by and shouts "here are the best honeys, from the best bees!" "One of us stung the attack and threw the idea on the table to bring out the band Melisses", Christos Mastoras has said in an interview.

They made their debut with the song "Kryfa", which remained in the top 10 of Greek radio for 3 months, while in March 2010 they released their first album, entitled "Mystiko".

In 2010 they received the award for Best New Artist at the Mad VMA, while they even reached the European MTV as they were nominated for best Greek act.

From the beginning of their career, Melisses have made absolute success… and they continue!

Awards

 Albums

2010: Mystiko
2011: Akou
2013: I Moni Epilogi
2017: To Kyma
2021: Duets

 Digital Singles

 Mad VMA Awards

 Official IFPI Top200 Airplay Chart by MediaInspector

Albums & Singles

Live Shows 
Melisses have made live shows in all the important theaters of Greece, such as the Odeon of Herodes Atticus, Athens Concert Hall, Thessaloniki Concert Hall, Stavros Niarchos Cultural Center  and the Technopolis of Athens, while they have appeared in major music events such as the MAD VMA, Athens Pride, the Nostos Festival and the Horn Theater Awards. They were also among the artists who sang at Panik Records' 10th anniversary concert.

At the same time, their live shows in Athens and Thessaloniki are always sold out. For the last 6 years they have been appearing steadily at "Box Athens", offering a unique live clubbing entertainment experience. They have also appeared on popular television shows, such as "Spiti Me To Mega"  and "Just The 2 Of Us" [17].

Socially aware, the band often gives concerts for a good cause. Among other s, in 2019 they sang about the 50 years of ELEPAP at the Thessaloniki Concert Hall and the proceeds were donated to the Foundation and in 2021 they gave the live streaming concert "MEΛISSES for the dogs" the proceeds of which were donated for actions of Save A Greek Stray (SGS) for the protection of strays.

Also, in 2020, in the midst of the global pandemic covid-19, MEΛISSES deposited the amount of 5,000 euros, which would be given for the music video their hit single "Misi Kardia", in the special account of the Greek State for the hospitals.

External links

Greek pop rock music groups